Grafton Way is a street in the London Borough of Camden that runs from Tottenham Court Road in the east to Fitzroy Street in the west. Whitfield Street and Grafton Mews adjoin Grafton Way.

The street was originally known as Grafton Street.

Venezuelan revolutionary Francisco de Miranda lived in Grafton Street from 1803 to 1810.

References

External links 

Streets in the London Borough of Camden